Ariane Films (French - Les Films Ariane) was a French film company, founded by Alexandre Mnouchkine and named after his daughter Ariane Mnouchkine. In 2000, the company ceased operations, and all of its films were acquired by TF1 International, the film division of French broadcaster TF1.

References 

Film production companies of France